Ardovie is a settlement on the perimeter of Montreathmont Moor, 3 miles south of Brechin.

References

See also
Brechin

Villages in Angus, Scotland